What If... is a 2012 Greek drama film directed by Christoforos Papakaliatis. The film won the Best Sound award in Hellenic Film Academy Awards.

Cast
Christoforos Papakaliatis - Dimitris
Marina Kalogirou - Christina
Maro Kontou - Elenitsa Kokovikou
Giorgos Konstadinou - Antonakis Kokovikos

Awards

References

External links
 

2012 drama films
2012 films
Greek drama films